Old Road is a town located on a roadstead in southern Antigua island in Antigua and Barbuda.

It is overlooked by Boggy Peak, which lies to its northwest.

Old Road F.C. is based in the town.

Demographics

Enumeration Districts 
 80800 OldRoad-North 
 80900 OldRoad-ClareMont 
 81000 OldRoad-Central 
 81100 OldRoad-MorrisBay
 81201  OldRoad-West_1
 81202  OldRoad-West_2

Census Data

References

Populated places in Antigua and Barbuda
Saint Mary Parish, Antigua and Barbuda